Nebulosa crypsispila is a moth of the family Notodontidae. It is found in Panama and Costa Rica.

References

Moths described in 1901
Notodontidae